Klára Ungár (born August 14, 1958, in Budapest) is a Hungarian politician. A founding member of the Fidesz party, she sat in the National Assembly for the Alliance of Free Democrats until 1998. She is one of the first openly homosexual female politicians in Hungary.

References 

1958 births
Living people
Hungarian lesbians
Hungarian LGBT politicians
LGBT legislators